Konstantinos "Kostas" Keramidas (21 March 1965, Athens) is a Greek professional basketball coach.

Club coaching career
During his coaching career, Keramidas has been the head coach of numerous basketball clubs, in both men's and women's professional leagues.

National team coaching career
Keramidas has worked as the head coach of the senior Greek women's national basketball team. Most notably, he coached Greece at the 2017 EuroBasket Women, and at the 2018 FIBA World Cup Women.

References

External links
Kostas Keramidas at eurobasket.com
Kostas Keramidas at theplayerspick.com 
Kostas Keramidas at kba.com.gr
Kostas Keramidas at ebasket.gr 
Keramidas: A personal stake

1965 births
Living people
Aigaleo B.C. coaches
Apollon Patras B.C. coaches
Basketball Agia Paraskevi coaches
Greek basketball coaches
Larisa B.C. coaches
Maroussi B.C. coaches
National and Kapodistrian University of Athens alumni
Basketball players from Athens